In geometry, a hypercube is an n-dimensional analogue of a square and a cube. It is a closed, compact, convex figure whose 1-skeleton consists of groups of opposite parallel line segments aligned in each of the space's dimensions, perpendicular to each other and of the same length.

An n-dimensional hypercube is more commonly referred to as an n-cube or sometimes as an n-dimensional cube.  The term measure polytope (originally from Elte, 1912)  is also used, notably in the work of H. S. M. Coxeter who also labels the hypercubes the γn polytopes.

The hypercube is the special case of a hyperrectangle (also called an n-orthotope).

A unit hypercube is a hypercube whose side has length one unit.  Often, the hypercube whose corners (or vertices) are the 2n points in Rn with each coordinate equal to 0 or 1 is called the unit hypercube.

Construction 

A hypercube can be defined by increasing the numbers of dimensions of a shape:

0 – A point is a hypercube of dimension zero.
1 – If one moves this point one unit length, it will sweep out a line segment, which is a unit hypercube of dimension one.
2 – If one moves this line segment its length in a perpendicular direction from itself; it sweeps out a 2-dimensional square.
3 – If one moves the square one unit length in the direction perpendicular to the plane it lies on, it will generate a 3-dimensional cube.
4 – If one moves the cube one unit length into the fourth dimension, it generates a 4-dimensional unit hypercube (a unit tesseract).

This can be generalized to any number of dimensions. This process of sweeping out volumes can be formalized mathematically as a Minkowski sum: the d-dimensional hypercube is the Minkowski sum of d mutually perpendicular unit-length line segments, and is therefore an example of a zonotope.

The 1-skeleton of a hypercube is a hypercube graph.

Vertex coordinates 

This hypercube is also the cartesian product  of  copies of the unit interval . Another unit hypercube, centered at the origin of the ambient space, can be obtained from this one by a translation. It is the convex hull of the points whose vectors of Cartesian coordinates are

 

This unit hypercube is also the cartesian product .

The -dimensional hypercube obtained as the convex hull of the points with coordinates  or, equivalently as the Cartesian product  is also often considered due to the simpler form of its vertex coordinates.

Faces 
Every hypercube admits, as its faces, hypercubes of a lower dimension contained in its boundary. A hypercube of dimension  admits  facets, or faces of dimension : a (-dimensional) line segment has  endpoints; a (-dimensional) square has  sides or edges; a -dimensional cube has  square faces; a (-dimensional) tesseract has  three-dimensional cubes as its facets.

The number of the -dimensional hypercubes (just referred to as -cubes from here on) contained in the boundary of an -cube is

For example, the boundary of a -cube contains  cubes (-cubes),  squares (-cubes),  line segments (-cubes) and  vertices (-cubes). This identity can be proven by a simple combinatorial argument: for each of the  vertices of the hypercube, there are  ways to choose a collection of  edges incident to that vertex. Each of these collections defines one of the -dimensional faces incident to the considered vertex. Doing this for all the vertices of the hypercube, each of the -dimensional faces of the hypercube is counted  times since it has that many vertices, and we need to divide  by this number.

The number of facets of the hypercube can be used to compute the -dimensional volume of its boundary: that volume is  times the volume of a -dimensional hypercube; that is,  where  is the length of the edges of the hypercube.

These numbers can also be generated by the linear recurrence relation

For example, extending a square via its 4 vertices adds one extra line segment (edge) per vertex. Adding the opposite square to form a cube provides  line segments.

Graphs 
An n-cube can be projected inside a regular 2n-gonal polygon by a skew orthogonal projection, shown here from the line segment to the 16-cube.

Related families of polytopes 
The hypercubes are one of the few families of regular polytopes that are represented in any number of dimensions.

The hypercube (offset) family is one of three regular polytope families, labeled by Coxeter as γn. The other two are the hypercube dual family, the cross-polytopes, labeled as βn, and the simplices, labeled as αn. A fourth family, the infinite tessellations of hypercubes, he labeled as δn.

Another related family of semiregular and uniform polytopes is the demihypercubes, which are constructed from hypercubes with alternate vertices deleted and simplex facets added in the gaps, labeled as hγn.

n-cubes can be combined with their duals (the cross-polytopes) to form compound polytopes:

 In two dimensions, we obtain the octagrammic star figure {8/2},
 In three dimensions we obtain the compound of cube and octahedron,
 In four dimensions we obtain the compound of tesseract and 16-cell.

Relation to (n−1)-simplices 
The graph of the n-hypercube's edges is isomorphic to the Hasse diagram of the (n−1)-simplex's face lattice. This can be seen by orienting the n-hypercube so that two opposite vertices lie vertically, corresponding to the (n−1)-simplex itself and the null polytope, respectively. Each vertex connected to the top vertex then uniquely maps to one of the (n−1)-simplex's facets (n−2 faces), and each vertex connected to those vertices maps to one of the simplex's n−3 faces, and so forth, and the vertices connected to the bottom vertex map to the simplex's vertices.

This relation may be used to generate the face lattice of an (n−1)-simplex efficiently, since face lattice enumeration algorithms applicable to general polytopes are more computationally expensive.

Generalized hypercubes 
Regular complex polytopes can be defined in complex Hilbert space called generalized hypercubes, γ = p{4}2{3}...2{3}2, or ... Real solutions exist with p = 2, i.e. γ = γn = 2{4}2{3}...2{3}2 = {4,3,..,3}. The facets are generalized (n−1)-cube and the vertex figure are regular simplexes.

The regular polygon perimeter seen in these orthogonal projections is called a petrie polygon. The generalized squares (n = 2) are shown with edges outlined as red and blue alternating color p-edges, while the higher n-cubes are drawn with black outlined p-edges.

The number of m-face elements in a p-generalized n-cube are: . This is pn vertices and pn facets.

Relation to exponentiation 
Any positive integer raised to another positive integer power will yield a third integer, with this third integer being a specific type of figurate number corresponding to an n-cube with a number of dimensions corresponding to the exponential. For example, the exponent 2 will yield a square number or "perfect square", which can be arranged into a square shape with a side length corresponding to that of the base. Similarly, the exponent 3 will yield a perfect cube, an integer which can be arranged into a cube shape with a side length of the base. As a result, the act of raising a number to 2 or 3 is more commonly referred to as "squaring" and "cubing", respectively. However, the names of higher-order hypercubes do not appear to be in common use for higher powers.

See also 

 Hypercube interconnection network of computer architecture
 Hyperoctahedral group, the symmetry group of the hypercube
 Hypersphere
 Simplex
 Parallelotope
 Crucifixion (Corpus Hypercubus) (famous artwork)

Notes

References 
 
  p. 296, Table I (iii): Regular Polytopes, three regular polytopes in n dimensions (n ≥ 5)
  Cf Chapter 7.1 "Cubical Representation of Boolean Functions" wherein the notion of "hypercube" is introduced as a means of demonstrating a distance-1 code (Gray code) as the vertices of a hypercube, and then the hypercube with its vertices so labelled is squashed into two dimensions to form either a Veitch diagram or Karnaugh map.

External links 

 
 
 www.4d-screen.de (Rotation of 4D – 7D-Cube)
  Rotating a Hypercube by Enrique Zeleny, Wolfram Demonstrations Project.
 Stereoscopic Animated Hypercube
 Rudy Rucker and Farideh Dormishian's Hypercube Downloads
 A001787    Number of edges in an n-dimensional hypercube. at OEIS

Multi-dimensional geometry
Cubes